WandaVision is an American television miniseries created by Jac Schaeffer for the streaming service Disney+, based on Marvel Comics featuring the characters Wanda Maximoff / Scarlet Witch and Vision. It is the first television series in the Marvel Cinematic Universe (MCU) produced by Marvel Studios, with Schaeffer serving as head writer and Matt Shakman directing all nine episodes. Elizabeth Olsen and Paul Bettany reprise their respective roles as Wanda Maximoff and Vision from the MCU films, with Debra Jo Rupp, Fred Melamed, Kathryn Hahn, Teyonah Parris, Randall Park, Kat Dennings, and Evan Peters also starring. The series pays homage to past sitcoms, with Maximoff and Vision living in a reality that takes them through different decades of television tropes.

WandaVision premiered on Disney+ with its first two episodes on January 15, 2021, with subsequent episodes released weekly until March 5. The series garnered numerous awards and nominations, with most recognizing the series overall, acting, directing, writing, production values, and soundtrack. It was nominated for eight Primetime Emmy Awards and fifteen Primetime Creative Arts Emmy Awards (winning three Creative Arts Emmys), as well as one American Film Institute Award (won), one Annie Award, one Art Directors Guild Award (won), one Artios Award, one Black Reel Award, one BMI Film & TV Awards (won),  one Clio Music Award (won), two Clio Entertainment Awards (won), four Critics' Choice Television Awards, one Directors Guild of America Award, five Dorian Awards (winning three), one Dragon Award, three The Global TV Demand Awards, two Golden Globe Awards, four Golden Trailer Awards (winning one), one Grammy Award, one Harvey Award (won), seven Hollywood Critics Association TV Awards (winning two), one Hollywood Music in Media Award, two Hollywood Professional Association Awards (winning one), one Hugo Award, one Irish Film & Television Award, one Nebula Award (won), two Nickelodeon Kids' Choice Awards, one MTV Millennial Award (won), six MTV Movie & TV Awards (winning four), four People's Choice Awards, one Producers Guild of America Award, two Satellite Awards (winning one), one Shorty Award (won), one Society of Camera Operators Award, four TCA Awards, one TV Choice Award, three Visual Effects Society Awards, one World Soundtrack Award, and one Writers Guild of America Award.



Accolades

Notes

References

External links 
 

WandaVision
WandaVision
Accolades